Lincoln House may refer to:


United States
(by state)
Lincoln Home National Historic Site, Springfield, Illinois
Lincoln Boyhood National Memorial, Lincoln City, Indiana
Harlan-Lincoln House, Mount Pleasant, Iowa
Knob Creek Farm, Athertonville, Kentucky, also known  as Lincoln Boyhood Home
Abraham Lincoln Birthplace National Historic Site, Hodgenville, Kentucky
Mary Todd Lincoln House, Lexington, Kentucky
Mordecai Lincoln House (Springfield, Kentucky)
Lincoln House (Dennysville, Maine)
Lincoln House Club, Barnstable, Massachusetts
General Benjamin Lincoln House, Hingham, Massachusetts
Lincoln House (Lincoln, Massachusetts), Lincoln, Massachusetts
Ambrose Lincoln Jr. House, Taunton, Massachusetts
Asa Lincoln House, Taunton, Massachusetts
Gen. Thomas Lincoln House, Taunton, Massachusetts
Gov. Levi Lincoln House, Worcester, Massachusetts
Lincoln School (Owosso, Michigan), Owosso, Michigan
Anselm Lincoln House, Malone, New York
Mordecai Lincoln House (Lorane, Pennsylvania)
Lincoln House (Stickney, South Dakota)
John J. Lincoln House, Elkhorn, West Virginia

Australia
Lincoln House, former name of Lincoln Institute of Health Sciences, now a faculty of La Trobe University, Melbourne

India

Lincoln House (Mumbai), Breach Candy, Mumbai, former location of the US Consulate General, Mumbai

UK
 Lincoln House plc, former name of a listed company